St Clears railway station served the small town of St Clears, Carmarthenshire, Wales between 1854 and 1964. It was on the West Wales Line.

History
The station opened on 2 January 1854.

The station closed on 15 June 1964. An attempt to reopen the station in 1973 was made by five local authorities and organisations, together with the Department of the Environment, which jointly agreed to fund construction of a new station at a total cost of £5,400. The new station would have consisted of concrete platforms adjoining both tracks and timber waiting shelters provided with electric lighting. It had been hoped that works would be swiftly completed so that the first trains could call at St Clears by the end of Summer 1973, but this did not materialise.

New reopening proposals 
There has long been a local campaign for the reopening of the station, supported by Angela Burns AM and William Powell AM.

Locals started a Facebook campaign to reopen the station in 2010 which drew in thousands of supporters. The St Clears Times ran a community poll from 2010 and 95% of people who voted were in favour of opening the station.

There have been recent proposals to reopen the station as part of the Welsh Governments Rail infrastructure investment. In 2019 it was shortlisted by Welsh Government for further assessment, along with three other stations (from an original longlist of 12) as part of a national strategy to improve transport links. In 2020, funding was secured to reopen the station by 2024. Some initial activities (groundwork and surveying) were carried out in February and March 2022.Final design work has not been completed and a timetable for construction of the new station has yet to be announced.

Routes

See also 

 West Wales lines
 Transport for Wales
 Proposed railway stations in Wales

References

External links
St Clears Station on navigable 1946 O.S. map

Disused railway stations in Carmarthenshire
Former Great Western Railway stations
Railway stations in Great Britain opened in 1854
Railway stations in Great Britain closed in 1964
Beeching closures in Wales
Proposed railway stations in Wales
St Clears